Janne Rydberg was a Swedish spectroscopist and physicist, whom the following are named after:

 Rydberg constant
Rydberg, a unit of energy, derived from the Rydberg constant, equal to half the Hartree energy
Rydberg correction
Rydberg formula
Rydberg ionization spectroscopy 
Rydberg state 
Heavy Rydberg system 
Rydberg atom 
Rydberg matter 
Rydberg molecule
Rydberg polaron
Rydberg–Klein–Rees method 
Rydberg–Ritz combination principle

Others
Mendel-Rydberg Basin 
Rydberg (crater)
ryd